This is a list of commercial banks in Tunisia
 Banque Al-Baraka
 Arab Tunisian Bank (ATB)
 Banque Franco Tunisienne (BFT)
 Banque Nationale Agricole (BNA)
 Attijari Bank
 Banque de Tunisie (BT)
 Amen Bank (AB)
 Banque Internationale Arabe de Tunisie (BIAT)
 Société Tunisienne de Banque (STB)
 Union de Bancaire pour le Commerce et l’Industrie (UBCI)
  (UIB)
 Banque de l'Habitat (BH)
 Citibank
 Banque Tunisienne de Solidarite  (BTS)
 Arab Banking Corporation (ABC) and its subsidiary: ABC Tunisie
 Tunisian Qatari Bank (TQB)
 Banque de Tunisie et des Emirats (BTE)
 Banque Tuniso-Koweitienne (BTK)
 Banque de Financement des Petites et Moyennes Enterprises (BFPME)
 Banque Tuniso-Libyenne (BTL)
 Stusid Bank (STUSID)
 Banque Zitouna (ZITOUNA)
 Al Wifak Bank (WIFAK)

See also

 List of banks in Africa
 List of banks in the Arab world
 Central Bank of Tunisia
 Economy of Tunisia
 List of companies based in Tunisia

References

External links
 Website of Central Bank of Tunisia (English)

 
Banks
Tunisia
Tunisia